The athletics competition at the West African University Games has featured at all editions since the first in 1965. the most recent edition of the competition was the 14th, held in 2018.

A limited number of athletics medallists are known from the competitions.

Men's champions

100 metres
1977: 
1981: 
1989:

200 metres
1977: 
1981: 
1989:

400 metres
1977: 
1981: 
1989:

800 metres
1977: 
1981: 
1989:

1500 metres
1977: 
1981: 
1989:

5000 metres
1977: 
1981: 
1989:

10,000 metres
1989:

3000 metres steeplechase
1989:

110 metres hurdles
1977: 
1981: 
1989:

400 metres hurdles
1977: 
1981: 
1989:

High jump
1977: 
1981: 
1989:

Pole vault
1977: 
1981:

Long jump
1977: 
1981: 
1989:

Triple jump
1977: 
1981: 
1989:

Shot put
1977: 
1981: 
1989:

Discus throw
1977: 
1981: 
1989:

Javelin throw
1977: 
1981: 
1989:

4 × 100 metres relay
1977: 
1981: 
1989:

4 × 400 metres relay
1977: 
1981: 
1989:

Women's champions

100 metres
1977: 
1981: 
1989:

200 metres
1977: 
1981: 
1989:

400 metres
1977: 
1981: 
1989:

800 metres
1977: 
1981: 
1989:

1500 metres
1981: 
1989:

3000 metres
1989:

110 metres hurdles
1977: 
1981: 
1989:

400 metres hurdles
1989:

High jump
1977: 
1981: 
1989:

Long jump
1977: 
1981: 
1989:

Shot put
1977: 
1981: 
1989:

Discus throw
1977: 
1981: 
1989:

Javelin throw
1977: 
1981: 
1989:

4 × 100 metres relay
1977: 
1981: 
1989:

4 × 400 metres relay
1981: 
1989:

References

Champions
West African University Games. GBR Athletics. Retrieved 2021-01-21.

University Games
West African University Games